Anotogaster sieboldii, as known as golden-ringed dragonfly, jumbo dragonfly, Siebold's dragonfly or  in Japanese, 無霸勾蜓 in Chinese and 장수잠자리("jang-su-jamjari", means 'General Dragonfly') in Korean is the largest species of dragonfly native to Eastern Asia, especially Japan, Taiwan, China, Korean Peninsula. It can grow between 95 and 100 mm in length.

Life cycle
 Eggs hatch within a month of being laid. Nymphs can live for three to five years, moulting as many as ten times and growing as large as five centimeters in length. Like adult dragonfly, nymphs are obviously predatory insects. Once nymphs' size bigger and bigger, they hunt tadpoles, aquatic insects and small fish. The adult dragonfly mate and lay eggs within one to two months of metamorphosis. After mating, females head toward small creeks or ponds, not fast-moving rivers or lakes, to lay eggs. They will sometimes fly perpendicularly to the water, laying their eggs in mud or sand under the surface.

Notes

References

Cordulegastridae
Insects described in 1854